Krishnadasi is an Indian Tamil-language soap opera aired on Sun TV. It aired from 14 February 2000 to 25 October 2001 at 7:30 PM every Monday to Friday. The show stars veteran actors Gemini Ganesan and Nagesh (guest appearance only) alongside Nalini, Vietnam Veedu Sundaram, Ranjitha, Aravind Akash and Suja Raghuram. The show was produced by Prabhoo Nepaul. It is based on the novel written by Indra Soundar Rajan. The title track was composed by D. Imman and sung by Nithyasree Mahadevan.

Remarks
 Krishnadasi marked the debut of the actor Gemini Ganesan in television and his last performance in a character.
 Krishnadasi also marked the re-entry of actress Nalini into the media after a post-marriage 14-year hiatus.
 Krishnadasi title sequence is the first song composed by the music director D. Imman.

Cast

Plot
This serial revolved around the Devadasi practice that prevailed in Tamil Nadu almost a few years after India's independence and how the dasi women are treated by the society. The story followed the rivalry between Rudramuthi Sastri, a very powerful Brahman in that village and his family and Manonmani, the dasi of the village and her family in the small hamlet of Kandhanallur on the banks of the river Kaveri.

Manonmani, a dasi comes back to her ancestral village of Kandhanallur with her daughter, Krishnaveni after 15 years of exile from the village where she, her daughter and baby granddaughter, Meenaatchi, were exiled by the village's people. As soon as she arrives, she goes to meet Rudhramoorthi Sastri and his son Saminatha Sastri and vows that she will wreak havoc in their perfect lives like they wrecked hers 15 years ago.

Meanwhile, Saminatha Sastri's son, Sunderesan falls in love with Meenaatchi while they are studying at the college. Krishnaveni never revealed who was Meenatchi's father to anyone for reasons only known to her but Meenaatchi is determined to find out the truth. Pachiamma, the village midwife extorts Manonmani to safeguard a secret known only to them.

What is the reason for enmity between Manonmani and Rudhramoorthy Sastri? Why was Manonmani's family exiled from the village in the first place? Did Manonmani wreak havoc in Rudhramoorthi Sastri's family? Who is Meenaatchi's father and why is Krishnaveni keeping this a secret? What is the secret between Manonmani and Pachaiamma? What is the fate of the relationship between Sunderesan and Meenaatchi?  These are the questions that are answered in the course of this serial with many twists and turns.

Remake
Krishnadasi was remade in Hindi under the same title, Krishnadasi, starring Shravan Reddy and Sana Amin Sheikh on Colors with significant changes in the story.

YouTube release

The episodes of Krishnadasi are being officially released by the production house in their KPTV (Kutty Padmini TV) YouTube channel in the second half of 2018, more than 18 years after the premiere of episode 1 of Krishnadasi on Sun TV in the year 2000. The uploading of the episodes was stopped after 127 episodes as further episodes are not available with them. They have requested Raj TV for content and the channel is not responding (as per kptv YouTube channel comments).

See also
 List of programs broadcast by Sun TV
 List of TV shows aired on Sun TV (India)

References

External links
 Vision Time on YouTube
 Official website 
 Sun TV on YouTube
 Sun TV Network 
 Sun Group 

Sun TV original programming
2000 Tamil-language television series debuts
2002 Tamil-language television series endings
Tamil-language television shows
Television shows based on Tamil-language novels